= Herbivore effects on plant diversity =

Overview of herbivores' effects on plant diversity

Herbivores' effects on plant diversity vary across environmental changes. Herbivores could increase plant diversity or decrease plant diversity. Loss of plant diversity due to climate change can also affect herbivore and plant community relationships Herbivores are crucial in determining the distribution, abundance, and diversity of plant populations. Research indicates that by consuming large amounts of plant biomass, herbivores can directly reduce the local abundance of plants, thereby affecting the spatial distribution of different plant species. For example, the impact of herbivory is typically more pronounced in grassland species than in woodland forbs, especially in environments that undergo frequent disturbances.

== Dominant species effect ==
People used to think herbivores increase plant diversity by avoiding dominance. Dominant species tend to exclude subordinate species as competitive exclusion. However, the effects on plant diversity caused by variation in dominance could be beneficial or negative. Herbivores do increase bio-diversity by consuming dominant plant species, but they can also prefer eating subordinate species according to plants' palatability and quality. Plant palatability also heavily affects which plant species becomes dominant and which becomes subordinate, as palatability is a huge factor in whether herbivores choose to consume a certain plant more or less and hence affects its course of growth. In addition to the preference of herbivores, herbivores' effects on plant diversity are also influenced by other factors, defense trade-off theory, the predator-prey interaction, and inner traits of the environment and herbivores.

== Defense trade-off theory effect ==
One way that plants could differ in their susceptibility to herbivores is through defense trade-off. Defense trade-off theory is commonly used to be seen as a fundamental theory to maintain ecological evenness. Plants can make a trade-off response to resource allocation, such as between defense and growth. Defenses against herbivores on plant diversity can vary in different situations. It can be neutral, detrimental or beneficial for plant fitness. Defense trade-offs can be used to change plant phenotype based on environmental challenges (such as herbivory). Even in the absence of defensive trade-offs, herbivores may still be able to increase plant diversity, such as herbivores prefer subordinate species rather than dominant species.

The predator-prey interaction, especially the "top-down" regulation. Some of the consequences of high grazing pressure, is that plant productivity is reduced due to photosynthetic tissue removal thus, reducing their richness and/or abundance in the ecosystem. Herbivore damage to non-photosynthetic plant tissue has also been found to reduce flowering plant productivity due to its detrimental effect on plant attractiveness to pollinators. This is what we know as the top-down effect that in this case focuses on the herbivore population and plant communities. The predator-prey interaction encourages the adaptation in plant species which the predator prefers. The theory of "top-down" ecological regulation disproportionately manipulates the biomass of dominant species to increase diversity. The herbivore effect on plant is universal but still significantly distinguishes on each site, can be positive or negative. Overall, herbivory and its overarching effect on plant diversity can fluctuate due to many variables, such as herbivore population, plant phenology and palatability to herbivores.

== Productivity effect ==
In a highly productive system, the environment provides an organism with adequate resources to grow. The effects of herbivores competing for resources on the plant are more complicated. Moderate levels of herbivory can increase the productivity of biomass, including plants. The existence of herbivores can increase plant diversity by reducing the abundance of dominant species, redundant resources then can be used by subordinate species. Therefore, in a highly productive system, direct consumption of dominant plants could indirectly benefit those herbivory-resistant and unpalatable species. But the less productive system can support limited herbivores because of lack of resources. Herbivory boosts the abundance of most tolerant species and decreases the less-tolerant species' existence which accelerates the plant extinction. Moderate productive system sometimes barely has long-term effects on plant diversity. Because the environment provides a stable coexistence of different organisms. Even when herbivores create some disturbances to the community. The system is still able to recover to the original state.

Light is one of the most important resources in environments for plant species. Competition for light availability and predator avoidance are equally important. With the addition of the resources, more competition arises among plant species. But herbivores can buffer the diversity reduction. Especially large herbivores can enhance the bio-diversity by selectively excluding tall, dominant plant species, and increase light availability.

Plants can sense being touched, and they can use several strategies to defend against damage caused by herbivores, including the production of secondary metabolites known as allelochemicals, altering their attractiveness, and employing various defensive strategies such as escaping or avoiding herbivores, diverting herbivores toward non-essential parts, and encouraging the presence of natural enemies of herbivores.

== Body size of herbivores effect ==
Body size of herbivores is a key reason underlying the interaction between herbivores and plant diversity, and the body size explains many of the phenomena connected to herbivore-plant interaction. An increase of body size means it requires more nutrients and energy to sustain itself. Small herbivores are less likely to decrease plant diversity. Because small non-digging animals may not cause too many disturbances to the environment. Intermediate-sized herbivores mostly increase plant diversity by consuming or influencing the dominant plant species, such as herbivore birds, that can directly use dominant plant species. While some herbivores enhance plant diversity by indirect effects on plant competition. Some digging animals at this size local community environmental fluctuations. And the adaptation of plant species to avoid predators can also adjust the vegetation structure and increase diversity. Larger herbivores often increase plant diversity. They use competitively dominant plant species, and disperse seeds and create disorder of the soil. Besides, their urine position also adjusts the local plant distribution, and prevent light competition. With a larger body size, large herbivores tend to consume higher-quality and more plants to gain back the required amount of nutrition and energy. Larger herbivores also leave behind larger amounts of fecal matter, which tends to increase the nutrients needed to grow plants in herbivore dominated areas such as grasslands, such as nitrogen and phosphorus. Plant diversity can be highly variable when in the presence of herbivores, however studies have shown that grazing that occurs in herbivore assemblages, such as a mixture of cattle and sheep can increase plant diversity.

Therefore, the mechanisms of herbivores' effects on plant diversity are complicated. Generally, the existence of herbivores increases plant diversity. Moderate herbivore enhances plant productivity as it reduces self-shading and accelerates nutrient cycling. But varies according to different environmental factors, multiple factors combined to affect how herbivores influence plant diversity.
